Money Madness is a 1980 video game published by Instant Software for the TRS-80.

Contents
Money Madness is a game package containing two programs, Millionaire and Timber Baron.

Reception
Bruce Campbell reviewed Money Madness in The Space Gamer No. 39. Campbell commented that "For those interested in a business simulation, I recommend this package. Many single programs cost more. While Timber Baron is of primary interest, you may also enjoy a few games of Millionaire."

Reviews
Moves #56, p23

References

1980 video games
Instant Software games
TRS-80 games
TRS-80-only games
Video games developed in the United States